Kimbolton Castle is a country house in Kimbolton, Cambridgeshire, England. It was the final home of King Henry VIII's first wife, Catherine of Aragon.  Originally a medieval castle but converted into a stately palace, it was the family seat of the  Earls and Dukes of Manchester from 1615 until 1950. It now houses Kimbolton School.

History

The castle was built by Geoffrey Fitz Peter, 1st Earl of Essex, in the late 12th century. The inner court was rebuilt by Anne, Duchess of Buckingham, in the late 15th century.

The castle was acquired by Sir Richard Wingfield in 1522. Catherine of Aragon was sent here in April 1534 for refusing to give up her status or deny the validity of her marriage. The fenland climate damaged her health, and she died in the castle on 7 January 1536.

The castle was bought by Sir Henry Montagu, later created 1st Earl of Manchester, in 1615. The 4th Earl of Manchester, who was created 1st Duke of Manchester in 1719, had many works of reconstruction carried out between 1690 and 1720. These works included the rebuilding of the south wing, which had fallen down, to a design by Sir John Vanbrugh. The 4th Duke of Manchester commissioned Robert Adam to design the gatehouse which was constructed in 1766.

Many members of the Montagu family (Earls and Dukes of Manchester) are buried at St Andrew's Church in Kimbolton. Several Montagu monuments still exist in the South Chapel, while the Montagu vault (extended in 1853) is located beneath the North Chapel.

The 10th Duke of Manchester sold the contents in 1949, and the castle and 50 acres were sold to Kimbolton School in 1951.

Warren House
On the grounds of the castle is Warren House, where the warrener (estate rabbit gamekeeper) used to live, converted into a late 18th-century folly on command of one of the castle's inhabitants to add interest to his horizon, complete with a single decorative facade facing the castle; it is grade II* listed and owned by the Landmark Trust. The Trust renovated the house, under a design from architect Oliver Caroe, between 2011 and 2012.

See also
Castles in Great Britain and Ireland
List of castles in England

References

External links
Castle history on Kimbolton School's website
Visitor information from Kimbolton School's website
Warren House Landmark Trust information page

Country houses in Cambridgeshire
John Vanbrugh buildings
Tourist attractions in Cambridgeshire
Historic house museums in Cambridgeshire
Buildings and structures in Huntingdonshire
Castles in Cambridgeshire
Gardens by Capability Brown
Catherine of Aragon
Castle